The 2011 CPISRA Football 7-a-side World Championships was the world championship for men's national 7-a-side association football teams. CPISRA stands for Cerebral Palsy International Sports & Recreation Association. Athletes with a physical disability competed. The Championship took place in the Netherlands from 17 June to 1 July 2011.

Football 7-a-side was played with modified FIFA rules. Among the modifications were that there were seven players, no offside, a smaller playing field, and permission for one-handed throw-ins. Matches consisted of two thirty-minute halves, with a fifteen-minute half-time break. The Championships was a qualifying event for the London 2012 Paralympic Games.

Participating teams and officials

Qualifying
The following teams are qualified for the tournament:

The draw
During the draw, the teams were divided into pots because of rankings. Here, the following groups:

Squads
The individual teams contact following football gamblers on to:

Group A

Group B

Group C

Group D

Venues
The venues to be used for the World Championships were located in Assen, Emmen and Hoogeveen.

Format

The first round, or group stage, was a competition between the 16 teams divided among four groups of four, where each group engaged in a round-robin tournament within itself. The two highest ranked teams in each group advanced to the knockout stage for the position one to eight. the two lower ranked teams plays for the positions nine to 16. Teams were awarded three points for a win and one for a draw. When comparing teams in a group over-all result came before head-to-head.

In the knockout stage there were three rounds (quarter-finals, semi-finals, and the final). The winners plays for the higher positions, the losers for the lower positions. For any match in the knockout stage, a draw after 60 minutes of regulation time was followed by two 10 minute periods of extra time to determine a winner. If the teams were still tied, a penalty shoot-out was held to determine a winner.

Classification
Athletes with a physical disability competed. The athlete's disability was caused by a non-progressive brain damage that affects motor control, such as cerebral palsy, traumatic brain injury or stroke. Athletes must be ambulant.

Players were classified by level of disability.
C5: Athletes with difficulties when walking and running, but not in standing or when kicking the ball.
C6: Athletes with control and co-ordination problems of their upper limbs, especially when running.
C7: Athletes with hemiplegia.
C8: Athletes with minimal disability; must meet eligibility criteria and have an impairment that has impact on the sport of football.

Teams must field at least one class C5 or C6 player at all times. No more than two players of class C8 are permitted to play at the same time.

Group stage
The first round, or group stage, have seen the sixteen teams divided into four groups of four teams. In every match a maximum of 10 goals scored were counted. This is indicated with an asterisk (*)

Group A

Group B

Group C

Group D

Knockout stage

Quarter-finals
Position 9-16

Position 1-8

Semi-finals
Position 13-16

Position 9-12

Position 5-8

Position 1-4

Finals
Position 15-16

Position 13-14

Position 11-12

Position 9-10

Position 7-8

Position 5-6

Position 3-4

Final

Statistics

Goalscorers
11 goals

  Michael Barker
  Brian Vivot

9 goals
  Wanderson Silva de Oliveira

8 goals
  Gary Messett

7 goals

  Moslem Akbari
  Fábio da Silva Bordignon
  Sam Larkins

6 goals

  Jamie Ackinclose
  Bahman Ansari
  Laurie McGinley
  Lasha Murvanadze
  Daragh Snell

5 goals

  Volodymyr Antonyuk
  Josh McKinney
  Farzad Mehri
  Mariano Morana
  Raúl Pacheco Pérez
  Denys Ponomaryov
  Marthell Vazquez
  Iljas Visker

4 goals

  Lars Conijn
  Matthew Dimbylow
  Taras Dutko
  Luke Evans
  Sergio Clemente Muñoz
  Mark Robertson
  Dennis Straatman
  Aleksey Tumakov
  Serhiy Vakulenko
  Carlos Antón Valor

3 goals

  Thomas Brown
  Adam Ballou
  Alexey Chesmin
  Dihego Rezende Rodrigues
  George Fletcher
  Peter Kooij
  Aleksandr Kuligin
  Andrey Kuvaev
  Rodrigo Lugrin
  Joseph Markey
  Mykola Mikhovych
  Eric O'Flaherty
  Zaurbek Pagaev
  Ivan Potekhin
  Eduard Ramonov
  Marcos Salazar
  Aslanbek Sapiev
  Anatolii Shevchyk
  Martin Sinclair
  Behnam Sohrabibagherabadi
  John Swinkels
  Aaron Tiers
  Karl Townshend
  Vitaliy Trushev

2 goals

  Jean Adriano Rodrigues
  Baghi Sadegh Hassani
  Jasem Bakhshi
  David Barber
  Jan Francisco Brito da Costa
  Renato da Rocha Lima
  Brett Fairhall
  Alistair Heselton
  Oleksiy Hetun
  Dustin Hodgson
  Jonathan Paterson
  Mikael Jukarainen
  Stephan Lokhoff
  Mariano Morana
  Christopher Pyne
  Angel Gabriel Rodriquez
  Emyle Rudder
  Tetsuya Toda

1 goal

  Rasoul Atashafrouz
  Matthew Brown
  Jeremy Baird
  Mateus Francisco Tostes Calvo
  Anton Clarke
  Ramón del Pino Bernardó
  Paul Dollard
  Matthew Ellis
  Booshehri Ehsan Gholamhosseinpour
  Blair Glynn
  Carlos Rodríguez Grande
  José Carlos Monteiro Guimarᾶes
  Janne Helander
  Vyacheslav Larionov
  Graham Leclerc
  Brendon McAdam
  Jaesik Moon
  Haecheol Park
  Hashem Rastegarimobin
  James Richmond
  Ben Roche
  Ivan Shkvarlo
  Johannes Siikonen
  Taisei Taniguchi
  Andriy Tsukanov
  Ryuta Yoshino

own goals

  Raúl Carrillo Arjona (2 goals)
  Chris Fawcett
  Jaesik Moon
  Mariano Morana
  Jordan Raynes

Ranking

See also

References

External links
Official website from 19 July 2012
Twitter
WK CP-voetbal 2011 Youtube
Cerebral Palsy International Sports & Recreation Association (CPISRA)
International Federation of Cerebral Palsy Football (IFCPF)

2011 in association football
2011
2010–11 in Dutch football
Paralympic association football
CP football